Benoît Paire was the defending champion, but chose not to defend his title .

Andrey Rublev won the title, defeating Paul-Henri Mathieu 6–7(6–8) , 6–4, 6–4 in the final .

Seeds

Draw

Finals

Top half

Bottom half

References
 Main Draw
 Qualifying Draw

Open BNP Paribas Banque de Bretagne - Singles
2016 Singles